Kristie Lu Stout (born December 7, 1974) is an American journalist and news anchor for CNN International. She currently hosts the program Marketplace Asia and other feature programs. She previously hosted the daily news show News Stream, which emphasized news connected with technology, and the monthly news discussion programme, On China.

Early life and education 
Stout was born in  Philadelphia, Pennsylvania, to a European American father and a Han Chinese mother; as a result, she was raised in a partially Chinese-speaking household. Her mother was born in Taiwan to parents from Guizhou.

Stout grew up in Saratoga, California and graduated from Lynbrook High School in San Jose, California, where she was a founding member of the Lynbrook Speech and Debate Club, and worked as a model in her teens. She studied journalism as an undergraduate at Stanford University, writing for The Stanford Daily and KZSU. In the early 1990s, she traveled to China to learn Standard Chinese at Tsinghua University, freelance for the South China Morning Post, and worked at Sohu. In 1996, she started working as an editorial intern at Wired, and in 1997 she graduated with a master's degree in media studies from Stanford.

Career 

In 2000, a senior producer for CNN invited Stout to work as a "television and dotcom reporter" after listening to her give a speech about the internet in China at the Foreign Correspondents' Club, Hong Kong. Starting from 2001, she hosted the daily World Report which earned her a 2006 Asian Television Award as Best News Presenter or Anchor  when it was still called CNN Today. She occasionally also hosts the talk show Talk Asia. She previously hosted CNN's technology program Spark, their daily "Tech Watch" segment, and the monthly program Global Office. From 2010 to 2018, she hosted CNNI's premier Asia-Pacific Primetime show News Stream with Kristie Lu Stout, until it was cancelled due to budget cuts. Since then she has focused on feature programming including documentaries and anchors special breaking news events. She also fills in for Rosemary Church and Max Foster on their editions of CNN Newsroom.

Personal life 
Stout lives in Hong Kong with her daughter, Arabella. She is married to the Malaysian Chinese attorney Seung Chong (張偉頌).

References

External links

 
 Kristie Lu Stout's profile at CNN.com

1974 births
American expatriates in Hong Kong
American people of Taiwanese descent
Television personalities from Philadelphia
American women television journalists
Living people
Stanford University alumni
Tsinghua University alumni
CNN people
Journalists from California
American journalists of Chinese descent
Journalists from Pennsylvania
People from Cupertino, California
Lynbrook High School alumni
American women journalists of Asian descent
21st-century American women